Nouaceur is a province in the Moroccan region of Casablanca-Settat. Its population in 2004 was 236,119.  Its major town is Bouskoura,  although the administrative centre is Nouaceur.

Mohammed V International Airport is in Nouaceur.  In 2004 Royal Air Maroc announced that it was moving its head office from Casablanca to a location in Nouaceur, close to Mohammed V International Airport. The agreement to build the head office in Nouaceur was signed in 2009. Air Arabia Maroc has its head office in the arrivals terminal of the airport.

Subdivisions
The province is divided administratively into the following:

References

External links

 Province of Nouaceur

 
Nouaceur
Geography of Casablanca-Settat